The 2005 Portuguese motorcycle Grand Prix was the second round of the 2005 MotoGP Championship. It took place on the weekend of 15–17 April 2005 at the Autódromo do Estoril. Alex Barros won the MotoGP race, his last career victory, as well the last victory for a Brazilian rider until then.

MotoGP classification

250 cc classification

125 cc classification

Championship standings after the race (motoGP)

Below are the standings for the top five riders and constructors after round two has concluded.

Riders' Championship standings

Constructors' Championship standings

 Note: Only the top five positions are included for both sets of standings.

References

Portuguese motorcycle Grand Prix
Portuguese
Motorcycle Grand Prix